The Thomas Walker House is a historic house at 201 North Spring Street in Hardy, Arkansas.  Built in 1925, this -story stone structure is a particularly fine local example of Craftsman style.  It is fashioned out of rough-cut local fieldstone, and has a prominent front porch supported by tapered square columns, and its low-pitch cross gable roof has exposed rafter ends.  The interior retains period flooring, woodwork, and hardware.  The house was built for Leonard Brophy, who only lived there a few years before selling it to Thomas Walker.

The house was listed on the National Register of Historic Places in 2005.

See also
National Register of Historic Places listings in Sharp County, Arkansas

References

Houses on the National Register of Historic Places in Arkansas
Houses completed in 1925
Houses in Sharp County, Arkansas
National Register of Historic Places in Sharp County, Arkansas